Ronald Melrich Hansen (February 10, 1932 – March 15, 1993) was an American football guard and linebacker in the National Football League for the Washington Redskins.  He played college football at the University of Minnesota and was drafted in the 28th round of the 1954 NFL Draft.

1932 births
1993 deaths
American football offensive guards
Minnesota Golden Gophers football players
People from Northfield, Minnesota
Washington Redskins players
Players of American football from Minnesota